This is a list of selected solar eclipses from antiquity, in particular those with historical significance. Eclipses on this list were not only recorded, but sometimes would have large effects such as ending a war.

Historically significant solar eclipses

Statistics

Longest total eclipses 
Below is a list of the 10 longest total eclipses between the 30th century BC and the 4th century.

Solar eclipses by century

References

-00